The Cambridge Water Company is a water supply utility company serving Cambridge and the surrounding area. It was established by The Cambridge University and Town Waterworks Act, 1853 and was privately owned until it became a public limited company in 1996.  It was sold to Chung Kong Infrastructure Holdings Limited (CKI) in 2004, but was sold on to HSBC in 2011. The sale was made because CKI wanted to acquire Northumbrian Water, and retaining Cambridge Water would have resulted in the takeover of Northumbrian Water being referred to the Competition Commission. It became part of South Staffordshire Water in 2013.

The Cambridge Water Company is a water supply company and does not provide wastewater services. Anglian Water provides wastewater services to Cambridge Water customers.

Bibliography

References

Companies based in Cambridge
Water companies of England
Companies based in Hampshire
1853 establishments in England